Jeffrey Thomas Norton (born November 25, 1965) is an American former professional ice hockey defenseman who played 15 seasons in the National Hockey League (NHL).

Playing career
Norton was selected in the 1984 NHL Entry Draft by the New York Islanders. Norton played for Team USA Hockey in the 1988 Winter Olympics in Calgary, Alberta.  Norton has also played for the San Jose Sharks (three separate times), St. Louis Blues, Edmonton Oilers, Tampa Bay Lightning, Florida Panthers (two separate times), Pittsburgh Penguins, and Boston Bruins.

PPG Paints Arena statue
Norton and Rich Pilon are depicted as the two defenders Mario Lemieux skates between in a 4,700-pound bronze statue unveiled on March 7, 2012, at PPG Paints Arena (then called Consol Energy Center) in Pittsburgh, Pennsylvania.

Personal life
A graduate of the University of Michigan, he grew up in the town of Acton, Massachusetts and attended Cushing Academy. His younger brother, Brad also played hockey in the NHL.

Career statistics

Regular season and playoffs

International

Awards and honours

Transactions
June 20, 1993 – Traded from the New York Islanders to the San Jose Sharks for a 1994 third-round pick.
March 6, 1995 – Traded from the San Jose Sharks with conditional pick in the 1997 draft to the St. Louis Blues for Craig Janney and cash.
January 4, 1996 – Traded from the St. Louis Blues with Donald Dufresne to the Edmonton Oilers for Igor Kravchuk and Ken Sutton.
March 18, 1997 – Traded from the Edmonton Oilers to the Tampa Bay Lightning for Drew Bannister and a 1997 sixth-round pick (#141 – Peter Sarno).
January 16, 1998 – Traded from the Tampa Bay Lightning with Dino Ciccarelli to the Florida Panthers for Mark Fitzpatrick and Jody Hull.
November 11, 1998 – Traded from the Florida Panthers to the San Jose Sharks for Alex Hicks and a 1999 fifth-round pick (#140 – Adam Johnson).
March 19, 2002 – Traded from the Florida Panthers to the Boston Bruins for a 2002 sixth-round pick (#196 – Mikael Vuorio).

References

External links

1965 births
American men's ice hockey defensemen
Boston Bruins players
Edmonton Oilers players
Florida Panthers players
Frisk Asker Ishockey players
Ice hockey players from Massachusetts
Ice hockey players at the 1988 Winter Olympics
Living people
Michigan Wolverines men's ice hockey players
New York Islanders draft picks
New York Islanders players
Olympic ice hockey players of the United States
People from Acton, Massachusetts
Pittsburgh Penguins players
St. Louis Blues players
San Jose Sharks players
Tampa Bay Lightning players
People from Arlington, Massachusetts
Sportspeople from Middlesex County, Massachusetts